Capriccio, also released with the international titles Love & Passion and Capri Remembered, is an Italian erotic drama film directed by Tinto Brass. It is a liberal adaptation of the novel Le lettere da Capri by Mario Soldati.

Plot
Jennifer (Nicola Warren) and Fred (Andy J. Forest) are an American couple who met during their World War II service on the island of Capri. In the year 1947, they return to the island for their holiday and past memories as well as disappointments of their married life soon lead them to their former crushes on the island to whom they have been writing letters. Jennifer meets Ciro (Luigi Laezza), a womaniser waiter who deflowered her and has now become an affluent pimp while Fred finds prostitute Rosalba (Francesca Dellera). However, they are to realise that years have changed much more than they expected.

Cast
Nicola Warren: Jennifer
Andy J. Forest: Fred
Luigi Laezza: Ciro
Francesca Dellera: Rosalba
Isabella Biagini: Stella Polaris
Vittorio Caprioli: Don Vincenzo
Venantino Venantini: Alfredo
Beatrice Brass: Alice the babysitter (credited as Bea)
Carla Cipriani: the hotel owner (cameo)
Tinto Brass: the client (cameo)

External links

1987 films
1980s erotic drama films
Italian erotic drama films
Adultery in films
Films set in Campania
Films set on islands
Films set in 1947
1980s Italian-language films
English-language Italian films
1980s English-language films
Films directed by Tinto Brass
Capri, Campania
Films scored by Riz Ortolani
1987 multilingual films
Italian multilingual films
1980s Italian films